Boghos Bey Yusufian (1775 - 1844) was Egypt's Minister of Commerce, Minister of Foreign Affairs, and secretary of Muhammad Ali Pasha.

Biography 
His parents were Marta and Hovsep, who was an Armenian merchant from Kayseri. They later settled in Smyrna and had Boghos as their first child. He then assisted his uncle Arakel Abroyan, the then Dragoman of the British Consulate in Izmir. Arakel Abroyan passed on the post of dragoman to Boghos. Boghos Yusufian then gained his commercial expertise by leading a trading center based in the city of Trieste. In the 1790s, Boghos Bey Yusufian became customs officer of Muhammad Murad Bey in the city of Rosette. Boghos Bey Yusufian was such a successful merchant that he was invited by Governor Mohamed Ali to become his secretary and partner. Boghos Bey was appointed the Wali’s chief dragoman, translator, first counselor, official spokesman, Minister of Commerce and Foreign Affairs, and for decades Boghos Yusufian became Egypt’s leading statesman. The Wali placed such implicit trust in him that he signed documents even before they were drafted by Boghos Bey. Boghos Yousefian is considered the first Christian in Egypt to have been granted the title of Bey.

References 

1775 births
1844 deaths
People from İzmir
Egyptian people of Armenian descent
Smyrniote Armenians
Foreign ministers of Egypt
19th-century Egyptian people